HD 170642, also designated as HR 6942 or rarely 13 G. Coronae Australis, is a single star located in the southern constellation Corona Australis. It is faintly visible to the naked eye as a white hued star with an apparent magnitude of 5.16. At its current distance, HD 170642's brightness is diminished by 0.28 magnitudes due to interstellar dust. It has an absolute magnitude of +0.93.

This is an ordinary A-type main-sequence star with a stellar classification of A3 V. Other sources include broad/nebulous absorption lines due to rapid rotation. It has 2.25 times the mass of the Sun and is estimated to be 480 million years old. The star is metal enriched, having an iron abundance 74% greater than the Sun's.

References

A-type main-sequence stars
Corona Australis
Coronae Australis, 13
CD-39 12696
170642
090887
6942